Gouzon (Auvergnat: Gosom) is a commune in the Creuse department in central France.

Geography
The Route nationale 145 (European route E62) passes through the commune. The train station Parsac-Gouzon on the railroad line Montluçon - Saint-Sulpice-Laurière is located in the neighboring commune Parsac-Rimondeix.

Population

The inhabitants are known as Gouzonnais.

Sights
13th-century church with a shingle-covered steeple.
Church of St. Nicolas of the Forge (5 km) - Some medieval frescos.
Étang de Grands-Champs – Fly-fishing lake
Étang des Landes - 120 Hectares nature reserve.  Bird Observatory

Economy
Gouzon is also a cheese made in the Limousin region.

See also
 Communes of the Creuse département

References

External links
 Gouzon on Quid

Communes of Creuse